A herdshare is a contractual arrangement between a farmer and an owner of livestock - the shareholder or member - through which the shareholder is able to obtain raw milk, meat, offal and other profits of the livestock proportionate to the shareholder's interest in the herd.  Herdshares include cowshares, goatshares, and sheepshares, and are sometime referred to as "farmshares" or "dairy-shares," although the term "farmshare" can also refer to an entire farm (buildings, land, equipment, etc.)  held in joint ownership.

A herdshare enables consumers to obtain raw (unpasteurized) milk in a jurisdiction that may otherwise prohibit the sale of raw milk.  Parties may also choose to enter into herdshare agreements even in jurisdictions that do permit some type of raw milk sale because a herdshare may provide a more economically secure business model for a dairy farmer than conventional dairy farming otherwise would provide for.

Terms of the herdshare agreement
Under the terms of a herdshare agreement, the shareholder purchases a share of a dairy farmer's herd and receives a portion of either the product or the profit of the herd proportionate to the shareholder's corresponding interest.  Unlike a direct sale of raw milk for consideration, a shareholder pays a one-time fee in exchange for her undivided interest in the herd. This is the purchase agreement or the bill of sale. In addition to the bill of sale, the shareholder pays a monthly boarding fee (or "agistment fee") that covers the farmer's cost for labor and maintenance of the herd.

For example, if the farmer has one cow valued at $800, the shareholder may purchase a 1/25 undivided interest in the herd (or here, a single cow) for $32.00. The parties would execute a bill of sale transferring a 1/25 ownership stake in the cow from the farmer to the shareholder in exchange for $32.00. If the cow produces 30 gallons of milk per week, the shareholder may choose to receive up to 1 and a 1/5 gallons of milk per week (30 gallons of milk divided by 25 possible shares). If the cow is slaughtered, then the shareholder may also be entitled to 1/25 of the meat or the value of the meat. If the cow is shown at a competition and wins a prize, the shareholder may choose to receive up to 1/25 of the value of that award.

In addition to both the bill of sale and the boarding fee, the herdshare agreement may include terms for a trial period, collection and storage of the milk, care of the herd, maintenance of the farm, liability, default, and risk of loss. Terms for the boarding, care of the herd, and handling of the milk may be separate documents.

History of herdshares

Agistment
Advocates of herdshare arrangements argue that herdsharing is rooted in the common law tradition of agistment. Agistment is "a type of bailment in which a person, for a fee, allows animals to graze on his or her pasture." References to agistment in England can be traced as far back as 1305. Agistment is still practiced in the countries that make up the Commonwealth of Nations and in the western United States primarily for the grazing of beef cattle (and sometimes sheep).

Herdshare advocates maintain that the dairy farmer operating a herdshare is merely an "agister" who holds the cows in bailment for the cow's owners, the shareholders. However, some courts in the United States reject this interpretation of the herdshare agreement refusing to find that the shareholder has a legitimate claim to ownership in the herd; rather, those courts have found that the shareholder merely has a claim to the milk produced by the herd and that as such the agreement constitutes an unlawful exchange of consideration for raw milk.

In the United States
The Weston A. Price Foundation, an organization that encourages raw milk consumption and advocates for increased consumer access to raw milk, claims that the first example of an arrangement bearing some similarity to a herdshare occurred in 1627 when Captain Myles Standish of the Plymouth Colony purchased a 1/6 share of a "red cow."

The first herdshare began in the United States in 1995 in Loveland, Colorado at Guidestone CSA Farm and Center for Sustainable Living. In 2013, the Weston A. Price Foundation listed 365 herdshares operating in 31 states.

Motivation for participating in herdshares
Researchers at Michigan State University Department of Large Animal Clinical Studies interviewed 56 individuals all of whom obtained raw milk for personal consumption through a herdshare arrangement. Shareholders drove an average of 24 miles approximately 4 times per month to pick up their raw milk from the farm. Half of the respondents lived in the "country" while the remainder lived in the suburbs or the city. 64% of respondents had a bachelor's degree or higher. 91% of respondents believed that raw milk is healthier than pasteurized milk and nearly 80% disagreed with the claim that drinking raw milk would increase their risk of contracting a foodborne illness. Virtually all respondents had visited the farm where their milk was produced. Respondents drink raw milk for the following reasons:

Raw milk controversy

Legal status of herdshares in the United States

No jurisdiction in the United States bans either the production or the consumption of raw milk. However, a few states restrict to varying degrees the sale of raw milk. Twelve states in the United States permit herdshare arrangements via legislation, regulation, policy, or court decision:

Federal law
The federal government of the United States prohibits the interstate sale or transfer of raw milk.

No person shall cause to be delivered into interstate commerce or shall sell, otherwise distribute, or hold for sale or other distribution after shipment in interstate commerce any milk or milk product in final package form for direct human consumption [that has not been pasteurized].

While not expressly prohibiting herdshares, the language "otherwise distribute... in interstate commerce" would appear to bar herdshares from operating across state lines. Indeed, in 2012, the U.S. District Court for the Eastern District of Pennsylvania convicted a dairy farmer for unlawfully entering raw milk into interstate commerce. The farmer claimed to operate a herdshare. The court stated (in dicta) that the herdshare agreement here was
merely a subterfuge to create a transaction disguised as a sale of raw milk to consumers. The practical result of the arrangement is that consumers pay money to [the farmer] and receive raw milk, which is transported across state lines and left at a 'drop point.' As such, despite any artful language, the agreement involves the transfer of raw milk for consideration, which constitutes a sale and is lawfully regulated by the FDA.

Following this ruling, one noteworthy commentator speculated that the era of the herdshare agreement was nearing its end noting that raw milk activists would do better to pursue legislative rather than judicial strategies.

State laws
The regulatory power of the federal government does not currently extend to intrastate raw milk transactions. But at least one commentator has argued that the federal government may have authority to regulate the intrastate sale and transfer of raw milk in light of the Supreme Court's recent commerce clause jurisprudence.

46 of 50 states have adopted the Food and Drug Administration's Grade A Pasteurized Milk Ordinance (PMO), a uniform code of guidelines to promote the standardization of milk production. Section 9 of the PMO concerning the sale of raw milk reads in pertinent part:

[O]nly Grade “A” pasteurized, ultra-pasteurized, or aseptically processed and packaged milk and milk products shall be sold to the final consumer, to restaurants, soda fountains, grocery stores or similar establishments.

Several courts have interpreted the word "sale" in the PMO to preclude herdshares on the grounds that a herdshare is little more than an impermissible sale by another name. Nevertheless, herdshares continue to operate in states governed by the PMO.

State statutes
Not content to leave regulation of herdshares to either a court or agency interpretation of the PMO, seven states have supplemented the law with more precise language.  Nine states currently permit herdshares through statute: Colorado, Connecticut, Idaho, North Carolina, North Dakota, Tennessee, Utah, Tennessee, West Virginia, and Wyoming.  Nevada expressly prohibits milk herdshares by statute.

State regulations

One example of state regulations is found in Alaska, which permits the "owner" of the livestock to consume the milk of the animal. An example of how a court may determine ownership can be found in Slippy v. Northey below. Nevertheless, state officials in at least Alaska presume that the herdshare agreement vests ownership of a share of the herd in the shareholder.

Maryland prohibits herdsharing by regulation. The Court of Special Appeals of Maryland affirmed the state's prohibition of herdshares in its 2009 ruling in Ozaryo v. Maryland Dept. of Health and Mental Hygiene, et al.

State policy opinions
In 2013, the Michigan Department of Agriculture and Rural Development issued Policy # 1.40 stating that it would permit herdshare operations that include a signed agreement between the parties and allow for a "workable means of communication" between the farmer and the shareholders.

Court rulings
The Supreme Court of Virginia rejected a farmer's herdshare arrangement in its 1989 ruling in Kenley v. Solem. There, the farmer proposed to sell undivided interests in her goats for $50.00 per share plus a $3.00 daily maintenance fee that would entitle the shareholder to up to one gallon of milk per day. The court characterized this latter payment as merely a "sham payment for the gallon of milk received by the owner from [the defendant]." Virginia's administrative code at that time prohibited the sale of raw milk and milk products and still does to this day.

In spite of Virginia's regulatory code prohibiting raw milk sales and the Court's 1989 ruling, herdshares appear to be thriving in Virginia. Virginia's 88 herdshare operations listed on the Weston A. Price Foundation's Real Milk Finder webpage are the most of any state, even among those that statutorily permit herdsharing.

Herdshare activists heralded a 2006 Ohio trial court's ruling in Schmitmeyer v. Ohio Dept. of Agr.  as permitting herdshares by precedent. There, the court rejected ODA's attempt to delicense a dairy producer for unlawfully selling raw milk to consumers. The dairy farmer claimed that she was operating a herdshare. The herdshare agreement required shareholders to pay a flat $50.00 fee in addition to a weekly $6.00 per week boarding fee that the shareholders paid when they picked up their milk. The court questioned ODA's "inexact practice" of permitting some owners (the farmers) to consume raw milk but not other owners. Ohio's law prohibits any "raw milk retailer" from selling or "exposing for sale raw milk to the final consumer."

In 2012, an Iowa trial court invalidated a herdshare agreement in Slippy v. Northey. There, the shareholder challenged the state's issuance of a cease and desist letter to a dairy farmer managing her herdshare. While the court initially found that the Plaintiff lacked standing to challenge the state's action, it nevertheless proceeded to rule on the merits. It found that the Plaintiff's herdshare agreement amounted to little more than a share in an interest in milk and that it lacked sufficient characteristics of a transfer of a legitimate property interest in a herd of cows. Iowa's law only permits the sale of "grade 'A' pasteurized milk and milk products... to the final consumer." 37 years earlier, the Iowa Supreme Court in Johnson County v. Guernsey Ass'n of Johnson County, Iowa, Inc. invalidated a corporate structure for the distribution of raw milk to the final consumers.

Criticism and defense of herdshares
In addition to the rejection of herdshare agreements by several courts, one commentator has gone so far as to state that referring to herdshare agreements as "a species of legal maneuvering may be giving too much credit to an effort that that is designed to flout the law entirely, or at the very least avoid the often stringent requirements associated with licensure."

Raw milk and herdshare advocates argue that individuals have a fundamental right to contract, or in the alternative, that individuals have a fundamental right to consume and grow the foods of their choice. Courts have rejected both of these arguments.

Legal status of herdshares in Canada

Ongoing litigation in Ontario

In 2006, the government of Ontario filed charges against herdshare farmer, Michael Schmidt for violating both Section 18(1) of the Health Promotion and Protection Act which bars the sale and distribution of unpasteurized milk and Section 15(1) of the Milk Act which bars the operation of an unlicensed "milk plant." At the time the Crown charged Schmidt, he operated a 150-member herdshare with 24 cows on 100 acres at Glencolton Farms near Durham, Ontario. Members paid $300 for a single share of 1/4 of a cow. Schmidt was acquitted at his 2009 trial. The Crown appealed Schmidt's acquittal and in 2011 the Ontario Court of Justice overturned Schmidt's acquittal. The Court fined Schmidt $5,000 and ordered him to pay $50,000 in court costs.

The Ontario court found that the herdshare arrangement did not include a formal contract of purchase or sale and that legal title to the cows remained with Schmidt. It equated membership in the herdshare to membership in a "big box" store "that requires a fee to be paid in order to gain access to the products located therein."

Schmidt appealed his conviction. A trial was set for February 5, 2014 at the Ontario Court of Appeals.

Outbreaks in raw milk from herdshares in the United States
A herdshare agreement does not guarantee the safety of raw milk. Raw milk, like any other food product, is susceptible to contamination by foodborne pathogens which may result in illness. However, advocates maintain that a herdshare arrangement may offer the shareholder certain assurances relating to the care of the herd and handling of the milk that may result in a safer product that may otherwise be unavailable to consumers of retail raw milk purchased from either a grocery store, a farmers market or directly from the farmer at the farm or elsewhere.

In 2013, three of the eight bacteriological outbreaks in raw milk occurred in individuals who consumed milk produced on farms operating herdshares.

References

External links
British Columbia Herdshare Association
 California Herdshare Association
Don't Let Your Herdshare Agreement Land You in Court (Article)

Livestock